Darshan 24 is a Hindi-language 24/7 Hindu television channel, owned by BAG India Limited. The channel is a free-to-air and launched on 14 January 2015. The channel is available across all major cable and DTH platforms as well as online.

Hindi-language television channels in India
Television channels and stations established in 2015
Hindi-language television stations
Television channels based in Noida
2015 establishments in Uttar Pradesh